Terrapin Station (Limited Edition) is a triple CD live album by the Grateful Dead released in 1997. It was recorded on March 15, 1990—bassist Phil Lesh's 50th birthday—at the Capital Centre in Landover, Maryland, and contained a rare Beatles cover, "Revolution".  "Revolution" was a favorite song of Lesh's and had previously been played at his request. It also features the first performance of "Easy to Love You" in almost 10 years.  The concert performance from the previous night, recorded at the same venue, can be found on Spring 1990 (The Other One). Likewise, the concert from the following night, at the same venue, is contained on Spring 1990.  Additionally, the performances of "Walkin' Blues" and "Althea" from this show can be found on the live compilation album Without a Net.

Track listing

Disc one
First set:
"Jack Straw" (Hunter, Weir) – 6:19 →
"Sugaree" (Hunter, Garcia) – 11:14
"Easy to Love You" (Barlow, Mydland) – 6:32
"Walkin' Blues" (Johnson) – 6:12
"Althea" (Hunter, Garcia) – 8:32
"Just Like Tom Thumb's Blues" (Dylan) – 6:57
"Tennessee Jed" (Hunter, Garcia) – 9:17
"Cassidy" (Barlow, Weir) – 6:12 →
"Don't Ease Me In" (traditional) – 6:02

Disc two
Second set:
"China Cat Sunflower" (Hunter, Garcia) – 6:27 →
"I Know You Rider" (traditional) – 6:50
"Samson and Delilah" (traditional) – 7:07 →
"Terrapin Station" (Hunter, Garcia) – 14:23 →
"Mock Turtle Jam" (Grateful Dead) – 8:23 →
"Drums" (Hart, Kreutzmann) – 6:16 →

Disc three

Second set, continued:
"And" (Bob Bralove, Hart, Kreutzmann) – 3:43 →
"Space" (Garcia, Lesh, Mydland, Weir) – 10:06 →
"I Will Take You Home" (Mydland) – 4:20 →
"Wharf Rat" (Hunter, Garcia) – 10:59 →
"Throwing Stones" (Barlow, Weir) – 8:59 →
"Not Fade Away" (Hardin, Petty) – 9:21
Encore:
"Revolution" (Lennon, McCartney) – 5:07

Personnel
Grateful Dead
Jerry Garcia - lead guitar, vocals
Mickey Hart - drums, percussion
Bill Kreutzmann - drums, percussion
Phil Lesh - bass, vocals
Brent Mydland - Hammond organ, keyboards, vocals
Bob Weir - guitar, vocals

Production
John Cutler - recording
Amy Finkle - package design
Kelly & Mouse - package illustration
Joe Gastwirt - mastering

Notes

Grateful Dead live albums
1997 live albums
Grateful Dead Records live albums
Live Southern rock albums